People's Army (Polish: Armia Ludowa , abbriv.: AL) was a communist Soviet-backed partisan force set up by the communist Polish Workers' Party ('PR) during World War II. It was created on the order of the Polish State National Council on 1 January 1944. Its aims were to fight against Nazi Germany in occupied Poland, support the Soviet Red Army against the German forces and aid in the creation of a pro-Soviet communist government in Poland.

Along with the National Armed Forces, it was one of the military resistance organizations that refused to join the structures of the Polish Underground State or its military arm, the Home Army. The People's Army was much smaller than the Home Army, but propaganda in communist Poland espoused the myth that the reverse was the case.

Due to their close affiliation with the Soviet Union, which de facto controlled Armia Ludowa and its predecessors, Armia Ludowa can be seen as both a part of the Polish resistance as well as the Soviet partisan movement.

Background 
In 1939, 17 days after the German invasion, the Soviet Union also invaded Poland. There was no formal declaration of war by either side. The Polish government-in-exile established in London maintained contacts with its representatives in occupied Poland, the Polish Underground State. In 1943, following revelations about the Katyn massacre and the Polish government's insistence on investigation, the Soviet Union broke off diplomatic relations with the London Polish government, intending to establish a competing structure of power.

Following the German invasion of the Soviet Union, communist supporters in Poland, aided by Soviet advisers, had formed partisan units and created their own independent underground organization, whose aims were to support the Soviet military against German forces and aid the creation of a  communist government in Poland. Thus, the Gwardia Ludowa (GL, People's Guard) was created in 1942. Along with a portion of the National Armed Forces, this communist-led underground was one of the military resistance organizations in Poland that refused to join the structures of the Polish Underground State, and its military arm, the Home Army (Armia Krajowa).

History

Creation 
On 1 January 1944 the State National Council (Krajowa Rada Narodowa, KRN) replaced the Gwardia Ludowa with the AL. The KRN intended to gain volunteers from other groups. Upon its establishment, the organization comprised some 10,000 members. By the end of July 1944 (when much of Poland had been occupied by the Red Army) there were some 20,000–30,000 members, 5,000 of them being Soviet nationals. Lower estimates quote about 14,000 as its peak strength, whereas high estimates double the middle number, up to 50,000–60,000. About 6,000 of them were active full-time partisans. Whatever its exact size, AL was much smaller than ("a fraction of") the primary Polish resistance organization, the Armia Krajowa.

At the same time, GL/AL was much better armed than Armia Krajowa as a result of Soviet air drops; it might have even had a surplus of weaponry. It also had less strict discipline.

Polish People's Army 
Seven months after it came into existence, on 21 July 1944, the People's Army was integrated into the Polish Military in the USSR and formed the new People's Army of Poland (Ludowe Wojsko Polskie, LWP).  After the Red Army and the Soviet-organized 1st Polish Army entered Poland late in 1944 and early 1945, most People's Army members joined the communist 1st Polish Army. After the war, many of its members joined the ranks of the Ministry of Public Security of the People's Republic of Poland, or the Milicja Obywatelska (police).

Operations, propaganda and criticism 

According to AL's claims, it carried out about 900 operations, killing 20,000 Germans, derailing 350 trains, and destroying 79 bridges. However, GL/AL exploits were significantly exaggerated by communist propaganda in the People's Republic of Poland. Historian Piotr Gontarczyk estimates that only about 5–10% of the  GL/AL actions really took place, and that most instances of GL/AL fighting the German military were defending from German anti-partisan operations, with instances of the GL/AL attacking Germans on its own initiative being very rare. Rather than engaging military targets, the GL/AL preferred softer targets, such as German administration offices. That changed in 1944, when the GL/AL grew stronger and began engaging the German military more actively. According to the historian Mieczysław B. Biskupski, the AL was less concerned with fighting the Germans than with fighting the Home Army. According to Gontarczyk and Janusz Marszal, however, that was relatively uncommon, at least with regards to direct actions, but the GL/AL would often pass anonymous tips about the AK to the Gestapo.

The People's Army took part in the Warsaw Uprising. Official claims held that some 1,800 People's Army soldiers fought there, but modern research suggests the actual number to have been about 500.

As the GL/AL had a much poorer support network than the Home Army, which was supported by the Polish Underground State, and Soviet air drops did not supply the People's Army with foodstuffs, it often had to resort to forced requisitions, which is described by modern historians as "banditry". It often targeted mansions and churches. There were also incidents of GL/AL soldiers murdering Jews or fighting among themselves.

In one of its most secret and controversial actions, agents of the GL on 17 February 1944 seized an important document archive of the Underground State. Documents of importance to the communist activists were taken, and the remainder was turned over to the Gestapo agent, who had been duped into participating in the GL operation. Seven members of the Underground State were taken prisoner by the Germans in a cleanup operation and likely executed soon afterward.

Leadership 
The commander of the Armia Ludowa was General Michał Rola-Żymierski, and the chief of staff was a member of the Central Committee of the Polish Workers' Party, Colonel Franciszek Jóźwiak.

AL leadership took orders from the Soviet Union and represented Soviet, not Polish, interests of the state. The Polish Institute of National Remembrance, in its official description of the GL/AL, goes so far as to declare the organisation as part of the Soviet partisans, rather than the Polish resistance in World War II.

See also 
 Soviet partisans in Poland

Notes

References

Further reading

External links 
  Armia Ludowa
  ZKRPiBWP Polish veterans' organization
 http://michalw.narod.ru/index-ZiemiLubelskiej.html
 http://michalw.narod.ru/index-SynowieMazowsza.html
 http://michalw.narod.ru/index-ZiemiKieleckiej.html

World War II resistance movements
Military units and formations of Poland in World War II
Polish underground organisations during World War II
Poland–Soviet Union relations
Military units and formations established in 1944
Military units and formations disestablished in 1944
Polish resistance during World War II
Soviet partisans